The slender yellow bat (Rhogeessa gracilis) is a species of vesper bat. It is found only in Mexico. It ranges from Jalisco and Zacatecas to Oaxaca states, where it has been found in pine and pine-oak forests, tropical dry forest, and dry shrublands from 600 to 2,000 meters elevation.

References

Mammals described in 1897
Taxa named by Gerrit Smith Miller Jr.
Rhogeessa
Bats of Mexico
Endemic mammals of Mexico
Fauna of the Sierra Madre del Sur
Balsas dry forests
Taxonomy articles created by Polbot
Taxobox binomials not recognized by IUCN